Miler David Castillo Quiñónez (born 1 August 1987 in Eloy Alfaro, Ecuador) is an Ecuadorian professional footballer who plays for Alebrijes de Oaxaca of Ascenso MX.

References

Living people
1987 births
Ecuadorian footballers
Ascenso MX players
Atlético Mexiquense footballers
Lobos BUAP footballers
Alebrijes de Oaxaca players
Ecuadorian expatriate footballers
Expatriate footballers in Mexico
Ecuadorian expatriate sportspeople in Mexico
Association footballers not categorized by position